Arbelodes agassizi is a moth in the family Cossidae. It is found in South Africa, where it has been recorded from the Cederberg.

Etymology
The species is named for Dr David Agassiz.

References

Natural History Museum Lepidoptera generic names catalog

Endemic moths of South Africa
Moths described in 2010
Metarbelinae